The MTV Video Music Brazil awards (originally Video Music Awards Brazil), more commonly known as VMB, were MTV Brasil's annual award ceremony, established in 1995. MTV viewers picked the winners for most categories since 2001. 

Unlike in the MTV Video Music Awards, the most important category at the MTV Video Music Brazil was the Viewer's Choice, not the Video of the Year; both of these categories merged in 2005. In 2007, the awards have faced a major rebranding, with several categories extinguished (most notably the specific genre divisions) and even the trophies' design changed. From that year, the awards began to focus more on artists rather than music videos and the most important category became the Artist of the Year. However, the Video of the Year award continued to exist.

In 2013, due to the closure of MTV Brasil's operations, the ceremony was cancelled. In 2014, the second Brazilian version of MTV considered reviving the awards, but the plans were eventually discontinued in order to priorize MTV's international awards, such as the Video Music Awards and the Europe Music Awards. In 2018, MTV started to produce Millennial Awards Brazil as an award focused on Brazilian pop culture, being considered in some ways a successor to the VMB.

Venues / Hosts

Award Categories 
 Artist of the Year (2007-2012)
 Video of the Year (1995-2012)
 Hit of the Year (2007-2012)
 MTV Bet(2007-2012)
 Best New Artist in a Video/Breakthrough Artist (1995-2012)
 Best Male Video (1995-2012)
 Best Female Video (1995-2012)
 Best International Video(2002-2012)
 Best Pop Video (1995-2006, 2009-2012)
 Best Rock Video (1995-2006, 2009-2012)
 Best Rap Video (1995-2006, 2009-2012)
 Best MPB Video (1995-2006, 2009-2012)

Defunct Categories
 Viewers' Choice (1995-2006, Replaced by Artist of the Year)
 Webstar Of The Year (2007–2011)
 Webhit of The Year (2007–2011)
 Best Alternative Rock Video (2009-2010)
 Best Hardcore Video (2009-2010)
 Best Samba Video (2009-2010)
 Best Reggae Video (2009-2010)
 Best Instrumental Video (2009-2010)
 Best Electronic Video (1995–2006, 2009-2010)
 Best Direction in a Video (1995–2006)
 Best Editing in a Video (1995–2006)
 Best Art Director in a Video (1995–2006)
 Best Cinematography in a Video (1995–2006)

Award winners

1995
 Video Of The Year: Marisa Monte - Segue o Seco
 Best New Artist in a Video: Pato Fu - Sobre o Tempo
 Best Direction in a Video: Marisa Monte - Segue o Seco
 Best Editing in a Video: Marisa Monte - Segue o Seco
 Best Cinematography in a Video: Marisa Monte - Segue o Seco
 Best MPB Video: Marisa Monte - Segue o Seco
 Best Pop Video: Paralamas do Sucesso - Uma Brasileira
 Best Rap Video: Gabriel, O Pensador - 175 — Nada Especial
 Best Rock Video: Raimundos - Bê a Bá
 Best Demo-video: The Teahouse Band - Leaving It All behind
 Viewer's Choice: Paralamas do Sucesso - Uma Brasileira

1996
 Video Of The Year: Paralamas do Sucesso - Lourinha Bombril
 Best New Artist in a Video: Karnak - Comendo Uva na Chuva
 Best Video Director: Paralamas do Sucesso - Lourinha Bombril
 Best Edited Video: Paralamas do Sucesso - Lourinha Bombril
 Best Photography: Marina Lima - Beija Flor
 Best MPB Video: Nando Reis - A Fila
 Best Pop Video: Skank - Garota Nacional
 Best Rap Video: Gabriel, O Pensador - Rabo de Saia
 Best Rock Video: Barão Vermelho - Vem Quente Que Eu Estou Fervendo
 Best Demo-video: Mulheres que Dizem Sim - Eu Sou Melhor Que Você
 Viewer's Choice: Skank - Garota Nacional

1997
 Video Of The Year: Paralamas do Sucesso - Busca Vida
 Best New Artist in a Video: Claudinho & Buchecha - Conquista
 Best Video Director: Karnak - Alma Não Tem Cor
 Best Edited Video: Skank - É uma Partida de Futebol
 Best Photography: Daniela Mercury - Nobre Vagabundo
 Best MPB Video: Chico César - Mama África
 Best Pop Video: Skank - É uma Partida de Futebol
 Best Rap Video: Pavilhão 9 - Mandando Bronca
 Best Rock Video: Sepultura - Ratamahatta
 Best Demo-video: Comunidade NinJitsu - Detetive
 Viewer's Choice: Skank - É uma Partida de Futebol

1998
 Video Of The Year: Paralamas do Sucesso - Ela Disse Adeus
 Best New Artist in a Video: Charlie Brown Jr. - Proibida pra Mim
 Best Video Director: Paralamas do Sucesso - Ela Disse Adeus
 Best Art Direction: Paralamas do Sucesso - Ela Disse Adeus
 Best Edited Video: Lulu Santos - Hyperconectividade
 Best Photography: Paralamas do Sucesso - Ela Disse Adeus
 Best MPB Video: Caetano Veloso - Não Enche
 Best Pop Video: Paralamas do Sucesso - Ela Disse Adeus
 Best Rap Video: Racionais MC's - Diário de um Detento
 Best Rock Video: Raimundos - Andar na Pedra
 Best Demo-video: Paulo Francis Vai Pro Céu - Perdidos no Espaço
 Viewer's Choice: Racionais MC's - Diário de um Detento

1999
 Video Of The Year: Skank - Mandrake e os Cubanos
 Best New Artist in a Video: Otto - Bob
 Best Video Director: Karnak - Universo Umbigo
 Best Art Direction: Skank - Mandrake e os Cubanos
 Best Edited Video: Paralamas do Sucesso - Depois da Queda o Coice
 Best Photography: Chico Buarque - Carioca
 Best MPB Video: Chico Buarque - Carioca
 Best Pop Video: Arnaldo Antunes - Música para Ouvir / Skank - Mandrake e os Cubanos
 Best Rap Video: Câmbio Negro - Esse É o Meu País
 Best Rock Video: Raimundos - Mulher de Fases
 Best Axé Video: Banda Eva - Carro Velho
 Best Pagode Video: Zeca Pagodinho - Vai Vadiar
 Best Demo-video: Caboclada - E Aí, Beleza?
 Viewer's Choice: Raimundos - Mulher de Fases

2000
 Video Of The Year: O Rappa - A Minha Alma (A Paz Que Eu Não Quero)
 Best New Artist in a Video: Los Hermanos - Anna Júlia
 Best Video Director: O Rappa - A Minha Alma (A Paz Que Eu Não Quero)
 Best Art Direction: Pato Fu - Made in Japan
 Best Edited Video: O Rappa - A Minha Alma (A Paz Que Eu Não Quero)
 Best Photography: O Rappa - A Minha Alma (A Paz Que Eu Não Quero)
 Best Animation: Andrea Marquee - O Que Aconteceu com Nosso Amor
 Best MPB Video: Marisa Monte - Amor I Love You
 Best Pop Video: Skank - Três Lados
 Best Rap Video: Xis - Us Mano e as Mina
 Best Rock Video: O Rappa - A Minha Alma (A Paz Que Eu Não Quero)
 Best Axé Video: Daniela Mercury - Ilê Pérola Negra
 Best Pagode Video: Os Travessos - Meu Querubim
 Best Demo-video: Radar Tantã - Na Dúvida Atire
 Best Electronic Video: Golden Shower - Video Computer System
 Viewer's Choice: O Rappa - A Minha Alma (A Paz Que Eu Não Quero)
 Best Website: Marisa Monte - http://www.marisamonte.com.br

2001
 Video Of The Year: O Rappa - O Que Sobrou do Céu
 Best New Artist in a Video: Bidê ou Balde - Melissa
 Best Video Director: O Rappa - O Que Sobrou do Céu
 Best Art Direction: AD - AD#27 (Get Down)
 Best Edited Video: Gabriel, O Pensador - Até Quando?
 Best Photography: O Rappa - O Que Sobrou do Céu
 Best MPB Video: Marisa Monte - O Que Me Importa
 Best Pop Video: Pato Fu - Eu
 Best Rap Video: MV Bill - Soldado do Morro
 Best Rock Video: Charlie Brown Jr. - Rubão, o Dono do Mundo
 Best Demo-video: Feijão com Arroz - Joe Camarada
 Best Electronic Video: DJ Marky - Tudo
 Viewer's Choice: Charlie Brown Jr. - Rubão, o Dono do Mundo
 Best Website: Raimundos - https://web.archive.org/web/20170920053534/http://raimundos.org/
 Worse Music Video of World: Supla - Green Hair

2002
 Best Rock Video: Titãs - Epitáfio
 Best Electronic Video: 2Freakz - Station
 Best International Video: Linkin Park - In The End
 Best Demo-video: Ratos de Porão - Agressão, Repressão
 Best MPB Video: Zeca Pagodinho - Deixa a Vida me Levar
 Best Photography: Caetano Veloso and Jorge Mautner - Todo Errado
 Best Art Director: O Rappa -  Coletivo
 Best Edited: Gabriel, O Pensador - Tem Alguém Aí
 Best Pop Video: Frejat - Segredos
 Best Video Director: O Rappa -  Coletivo
 Best Website: Comunidade Ninjitsu - https://web.archive.org/web/20170924035540/http://comunidadeninjitsu.com.br/
 Best Rap Video: Xis - Chapa o Coco
 Best New Artist in a Video: CPM 22 - Tarde de Outubro
 Video Of The Year: Titãs - Epitáfio
 Viewer's Choice: Titãs - Epitáfio

2003
 Best Rock Video: Charlie Brown Jr. - Só por uma Noite
 Best Electronic Video: Fernanda Porto and DJ Patife - Sambassim (DJ Patife)
 Best International Video: Linkin Park - Somewhere I Belong
 Best Independent Video: Ratos de Porão - Próximo Alvo
 Best MPB Video: Gilberto Gil - Three Little Birds
 Best Photography: Sepultura - Bullet The Blue Sky
 Best Art Director: Gilberto Gil - Three Little Birds
 Best Edited Video: Pato Fu - Não Mais
 Best Pop Video: Skank - Dois Rios
 Best Video Director: Marcelo D2 - Qual É?
 Best Website: Nando Reis - http://www.nandoreis.com.br
 Best Rap Video: Marcelo D2 - Qual É?
 Best New Artist in a Video: Detonautas Roque Clube - Quando o Sol Se For
 Video Of The Year: Marcelo D2 - Qual É?
 Viewer's Choice: Charlie Brown Jr. - Papo Reto (Prazer É Sexo, o Resto É Negócio)

2004
 Best Rock Video: Pitty - Equalize
 Best Electronic Video: Marcelinho da Lua and Seu Jorge - Cotidiano
 Best International Video: Linkin Park - Numb
 Best Independent Video: Ludov - Princesa
 Best MPB Video: Seu Jorge - Tive Razão
 Best Photography: Marcelo D2 - Loadeando
 Best Art Director: Elza Soares - Rio de Janeiro
 Best Edited Video: O Rappa - O Salto
 Best Pop Video: Skank - Vou Deixar
 Best Video Director: O Rappa - O Salto
 Best Website: Detonautas - http://www.detonautas.com.br
 Best Rap Video: Marcelo D2 - Loadeando
 Best New Artist in a Video: Dead Fish - Zero e Um
 Video Of The Year: Marcelo D2 - Loadeando
 Viewer's Choice: Pitty - Admirável Chip Novo

2005
 Best Rock Video: CPM 22 - Um Minuto para o Fim do Mundo
 Best Electronic Video: Marcelinho da Lua - Refazenda
 Best International Video: System of a Down - B.Y.O.B.
 Best Independent Video: Autoramas - Você Sabe
 Best MPB Video: Marcelo D2 - A Maldição do Samba
 Best Photography: Gabriel, O Pensador - Palavras Repetidas
 Best Art Director: Pato Fu - Anormal
 Best Edited Video: Autoramas - Você Sabe
 Best Pop Video: Gabriel, O Pensador - Palavras Repetidas
 Best Video Director: Autoramas - Você Sabe
 Best Website: Moptop - https://web.archive.org/web/20100912144715/http://www.moptop.com.br/
 Best Rap Video: Helião and Negra Li - Exército do Rap
 Best New Artist in a Video: Leela - Te Procuro
 Best Live Performance in a Video: Ira! and Pitty - Eu Quero Sempre Mais
 Video of the Year - Viewer's Choice: CPM 22 - Um Minuto para o Fim do Mundo
 Idol MTV: Pitty
 Dream band: Pitty, vocals; Edgard Scandurra (Ira!), guitar; Champignon (Revolucionnários), bass; Japinha (CPM 22), drums.

2006
 Best Rock Video: Pitty - Déjà-Vu
 Best Rap Video: Marcelo D2 - Gueto
 Best MPB Video: Los Hermanos - Morena
 Best Direction in a Video: Sepultura - Convicted In Life
 Best New Artist in a Video: Hateen - Quem Já Perdeu Um Sonho Aqui?
 Vc Fez ("U Made It", viewer-made video): Marcelo Veron, with a version of "1997", song of the band Hateen.
 Best Live Performance in a Video: CPM 22 - Inevitável
 Best Independent Video: Banzé - Doce Ilusão
 Dream Band: Pitty, vocals; Fabrizio Martinelli (Hateen), guitar; Champignon (Revolucionnários), bass; Japinha (CPM 22), drums.
 Best Pop Video: Jota Quest - O Sol
 Best Editing in a Video: Sepultura - Convicted In Life
 Best Art Direction in a Video: Nação Zumbi - Hoje, Amanhã e Depois
 Best Cinematography in a Video: Lulu Santos - Vale de Lágrimas
 Best International Video: The Black Eyed Peas - Pump It
 Best Fansite: Pitty - https://web.archive.org/web/20110715085325/http://www.pittybr.com/
 Video of the Year - Viewer's Choice: Pitty - Memórias

2007
 Breakthrough Artist: Fresno
 MTV Bet ("Aposta MTV"): Strike
 Best Live Performance: Cachorro Grande
 Web Hit: "Vai Tomar no C*"
 Video You Made ("Clipe que Você Fez", viewer-made video): Gabriel Alves, with a version of "Na Sua Estante", by Pitty.
 Dream Band: Pitty, vocals; Fabrizio Martinelli (Hateen), guitar; Champignon (Revolucionnários), bass; Japinha (CPM 22), drums.
 International Artist: Red Hot Chili Peppers
 Hit of the Year: NX Zero - Razões e Emoções
 Video of the Year: Pitty - Na Sua Estante
 Artist of the Year: NX Zero

2008

 Breakthrough Artist: Strike
 MTV Bet ("Aposta MTV"): Garotas Suecas
 Best Live Performance: Pitty
 Web Hit: Dança do Quadrado
 Video You Made ("Clipe que Você Fez", viewer-made video): Fábio Viana with a version of "Uma Música", by Fresno
 Dream Band: Marcelo D2, vocals; Chimbinha (Banda Calypso), guitar; Bi Ribeiro (Os Paralamas do Sucesso), bass; João Barone (Os Paralamas do Sucesso), drums
 International Artist: Paramore
 Hit of the Year: NX Zero - Pela Última Vez
 Video of the Year: NX Zero - Pela Última Vez
 Artist of the Year: NX Zero

2009

 Artist of the Year: Fresno
 Hit of the Year: NX Zero – "Cartas pra você"
 Video of the Year: Skank – "Sutilmente"
 International Artist: Britney Spears
 Best Live Performance: Os Paralamas do Sucesso
 Breakthrough Artist: Cine
 MTV Bet: Vivendo do Ócio
 Dream Band:
 Vocals: Lucas Silveira (Fresno);
 Guitar: Martin Mendonça (Pitty);
 Bass: Rodrigo Tavares (Fresno);
 Drums: Duda Machado (Pitty)
 Pop: Fresno
 Rock: Forfun
 Alternative Rock: Pública
 Hardcore: Dead Fish
 MPB: Fernanda Takai
 Samba: Zeca Pagodinho
 Reggae: Chimarruts
 Rap: MV Bill
 Instrumental: Pata de Elefante
 Electronica: N.A.S.A.
 Best Musical Documentary or Movie: Titãs - A Vida Até Parece Uma Festa (directed by Branco Mello and Oscar Rodrigues Alves)
 Web Hit of the Year: Os Seminovos – "Escolha já seu nerd"
 Blog of the Year: Jovem Nerd
 Twitter of the Year: Marcos Mion – @mionzera
 Game of the Year: The Sims 3

2010
 Artist of the Year: Restart
 Hit of the Year: Restart – "Levo Comigo"
 Video of the Year: Restart - "Recomeçar"
 International Artist: Justin Bieber
 Best Live Performance: NX Zero
 Breakthrough Artist:  Restart
 MTV Bet: Thiago Pethit
 International Bet: School of Seven Bells
 Rock: Pitty
 Pop: Restart
 MPB: Diogo Nogueira
 Rap: MV Bill
 Electronica: Boss in Drama
 Web Hit of the Year: Justin Biba - "Paródia Justin Bieber|Baby"
 Web Star: Felipe Neto
 Game of the Year: Super Mario Galaxy 2

2011

MTV "Academy"
 Artist of the Year: Emicida
 Video of the Year: Emicida - "Então Toma"
 Song of the Year: Criolo - "Não Existe Amor em SP"
 Breakthrough Artist: Criolo
 MTV Bet: Tono
 Album of the Year: Criolo - "Nó na Orelha"
 Album Art of the Year: Tiê - "A Coruja e o Coração"

Popular voting
 Hit of the Year: CW7 - "Me Acorde Pra Vida"
 International Artist: Lady Gaga
 Web Hit of the Year: Sou Foda
 Web Video of the Year: Banda Uó - "Shake de Amor"

2012

 Artist of the year - Gaby Amarantos
 Song of the year - Wado - "Com a ponta dos dedos" (Wado/Glauber Xavier), Emicida - "Dedo na ferida" (Emicida)
 Breakthrough Artist - Projota
 Album of the year - BNegão & Seletores de Frequência - "Sintoniza lá"
 Best Male - Criolo
 Best Female - Gaby Amarantos
 Best Group - Vanguart
 Best Cover - Gaby Amarantos: "Treme" (art: Greenvision/Gotazkaen)
 International Artist - One Direction
 Bet - O Terno
 Hit of the year - Restart - "Menina Estranha"
 Video of the year - Racionais MC's - "Mil faces de um homem leal" (Marighella) (dir. Daniel Grinspum)

See also
 MTV Brasil
 MTV Video Music Awards
 MTV Millennial Awards Brazil

References

External links
 Official MTV Brasil Website
 Official VMB Website
 VMB 2007 Hot Site
 VMB 2006 Hot Site
 VMB 2005 Hot Site
 VMB 2004 Hot Site
 VMB 2003 Hot Site
 VMB 2002 Hot Site

 
Music video awards
Recurring events established in 1995
Annual television shows
Awards established in 1995
Television in Brazil
1995 establishments in Brazil
2012 disestablishments in Brazil
Recurring events disestablished in 2012